Aldam Pettinger (30 July 1859 – 18 August 1950) was an Australian cricketer. He played in one first-class match for South Australia in 1880/81.

See also
 List of South Australian representative cricketers

References

External links
 

1859 births
1950 deaths
Australian cricketers
South Australia cricketers
Cricketers from Adelaide